John Norman Jnr (born 15 June 1974) is a Canadian professional darts player who plays in the Professional Darts Corporation (PDC) events.

He earned a PDC Tour Card in 2017, as one of the top 12 ranked players on the Q-School Order of Merit. He represented Canada in the 2017 PDC World Cup of Darts along with John Part, where they reached the second round before losing to the Austrian pairing of Mensur Suljović and Rowby-John Rodriguez.

World Championship results

PDC
 2022: First round (lost to Chas Barstow 1–3) (sets)

References

External links

1974 births
Living people
Canadian darts players
Professional Darts Corporation former tour card holders
PDC World Cup of Darts Canadian team